Samburu West is an electoral constituency in Kenya. It is one of three constituencies of Samburu County. The constituency was established for the 1969 elections.

Members of Parliament

Wards

References 

Constituencies in Samburu County
Constituencies in Rift Valley Province
1969 establishments in Kenya
Constituencies established in 1969